The Homecoming of Odysseus (German: Die Heimkehr des Odysseus) is a 1918 German silent comedy film directed by Rudolf Biebrach and starring Henny Porten, Bruno Decarli and Arthur Bergen.

Cast
 Henny Porten as Josepha, die Wirtin 
 Bruno Decarli as Hans Immerhofer, Bergführer 
 Arthur Bergen as Alois Buttermilch 
 Maria Fuchs as Magd 
 Rudolf Biebrach as Mond Jakob Schluifer 
 Marie Fuchs as Magd 
 Justus Glatz as Helli Nazi 
 Joseph Uhl as Schneider Vincenz

References

Bibliography
 Jung, Uli & Schatzberg, Walter. Beyond Caligari: The Films of Robert Wiene. Berghahn Books, 1999.

External links

1918 films
Films of the German Empire
German silent feature films
German comedy films
Films directed by Rudolf Biebrach
Films set in Bavaria
Films set in the Alps
German black-and-white films
UFA GmbH films
1918 comedy films
Silent comedy films
1910s German films
1910s German-language films